Jesús López may refer to:

 Jesús López (weightlifter) (born 1984), Venezuelan weightlifter
 Jesús López de Lara (1892–?), Spanish fencer
 Jesús López Pacheco (1930–1997), novelist, translator, poet and professor of Spanish
 Jesús López Cobos (1940–2018), Spanish conductor
 Jesús Francisco López (born 1997), Mexican footballer